We Stand On Guard is a science fiction comics series written by Brian K. Vaughan, with art by Steve Skroce and colouring by Matt Hollingsworth. The first issue, a large 44-page book, was published by Image Comics in July 2015.

The series is set in Canada in the years 2112–2124, in a time when it has been invaded by its neighbour the United States of America. The story centres on a band of resistance fighters in the seemingly vanquished Canada, and their exploits involving skirmishes with the United States Army and its vast supply of mechanised weapons, including giant robots.

We Stand On Guard consists of six issues and is a creator-owned work.

Reception
CBC News reviewer Eli Glasner's positive review said the work was more "direct and visually explosive" than any prior comic book treatment of Canada-U.S. relations.  Paste called it "intriguing, emotional and engaging enough to stand alone as a story".  The collected edition earned a spot on The New York Times hardcover graphic books bestseller list.

See also 

 War of 1812

External links
 We Stand On Guard

References

2015 comics debuts
Canada–United States relations in popular culture
Comics by Brian K. Vaughan
Water scarcity in fiction
Canadian graphic novels